The Asia Pacific Screen Award for Performance by an Actor has been given annually by the Asia Pacific Screen Academy since 2007.

Winners and Nominees

2000s

2010s

References

External links

Best Performance by an Actor
Lists of films by award